Adavi is a Local Government Area in Kogi State, Nigeria, adjoining Edo State in the south and the state capital Lokoja in the north. Its headquarters is in the town of Ogaminana near the A123 highway in the southwest of the area at.
 
It has an area of 718 km and a population of 202,194 at the 2006 census.

The postal code of the area is 264.

The inhabitants of Adavi are predominantly Ebiras[TAO] . They also  speak Ebiras language. Among their favourite staple foods are Igorigo (Beniseed), Ipapara (melon), Akara-etupa (groundnut cake), Iya (Pounded Yam), Apaapa (Beans Cake).

People 
Adavi is the birth place of Nigerian politician and businessman, Khalifa Abdulrahaman Okene. Also from Adavi was former Nigerian Senator, Pius Lasisi Jimoh.

References

Local Government Areas in Kogi State